"Just Like Honey" is a song by the Scottish alternative rock band The Jesus and Mary Chain from their 1985 debut album Psychocandy. The track was released as the third single from the record through Blanco y Negro Records in September 1985. The song was written by band members William Reid and Jim Reid.

The song has appeared in several films, most notably in the closing scene of 2003's Lost in Translation, as well as 2008's The Man Who Loved Yngve and a 2011 Volkswagen advertisement campaign. The track also features in "Mommy", the third episode of American Horror Story: Hotel, in which Angela Bassett's character Ramona Royale makes her first appearance. The beginning of the song uses the opening drum riff of The Ronettes' "Be My Baby".

Chart performance
The single reached number 45 on the UK Singles Chart.

Critical reception 
The song was ranked number 2 among the "Tracks of the Year" for 1985 by NME.

Track listing
All tracks written by Jim Reid and William Reid.

7" (NEG 17)
"Just Like Honey" – 3:00
"Head" – 3:48

2×7" Gatefold (NEG 17F)
"Just Like Honey" – 3:00
"Head" – 3:48
"Inside Me"– 3:08
"Just Like Honey" (Demo) – 2:54

12" (NEG 17T)
"Just Like Honey" – 3:00
"Head" – 3:48
"Cracked" – 3:43
"Just Like Honey" (Demo) – 2:54

Personnel

The Jesus and Mary Chain
Jim Reid – vocals, producer
William Reid – guitar, producer
Douglas Hart – bass guitar, producer
Bobby Gillespie – drums, producer

Additional personnel
Karen Parker – backing vocals
John Loder – audio engineer

Charts

References

The Jesus and Mary Chain songs
1985 singles
Songs written by Jim Reid
Songs written by William Reid (musician)
Blanco y Negro Records singles
1985 songs
Song recordings with Wall of Sound arrangements
Pop punk songs